Jan Adrianus Aertsen (7 September 1938 – 7 January 2016) was a Dutch philosopher and theologian. Born in Amsterdam, Aertsen received his PhD title at the Vrije Universiteit Amsterdam and taught there from 1984 up to his death. From 1993 to 2004, he served as a professor at the University of Cologne, and was the founding director of Thomas Instituut te Utrecht. He wrote several works on Thomism, starting from his doctoral thesis, Nature and Creature. Thomas Aquinas’s Way of Thought (1988), published in Dutch four years later.

References

External links 
 Selected bibliography of Jan A. Aertsen

1938 births
2016 deaths
20th-century Dutch philosophers
21st-century Dutch philosophers
20th-century Dutch Roman Catholic theologians
21st-century Dutch Roman Catholic theologians
Catholic philosophers
Philosophers of religion
Thomists
Vrije Universiteit Amsterdam alumni